Sydney Ayres (August 28, 1879 – September 9, 1916) was an American silent film actor, director and screenwriter.

Biography
Born Daniel Sydney Ayres in New York City, Ayres was known for his handsome, suave looks. He often simultaneously acted and directed films after 1913. In 1916, Ayres died from multiple sclerosis at the age of 37.

Selected filmography

Actor

 The Story of the Olive (1914)
 The Navy Aviator (1914)
 Does It End Right? (1914)
 True Western Hearts (1914)
 The Coming of the Padres (1914)

Director
 The Story of the Olive (1914)
 The Navy Aviator (1914)
 The Oath of Pierre (1914)
 Nature's Touch (1914)
 The Cameo of the Yellowstone (1914)
 Feat and Famine (1914)
 A Man's Way (1914)
 Does It End Right? (1914)
 Their Worldly Goods (1914)
 The Cocoon and the Butterfly (1914)
 His Faith in Humanity (1914)
 The Taming of Sunnybrook Nell (1914)
 Jail Birds (1914)
 In the Open (1914)
 Sir Galahad of Twilight (1914)
 Redbird Wins (1914)

Writer
 Business Versus Love (1914)
 Break, Break, Break (1914)

External links

 

1879 births
1916 deaths
American male film actors
American male silent film actors
American male screenwriters
Deaths from multiple sclerosis
Neurological disease deaths in California
Film directors from New York City
20th-century American male actors
Screenwriters from New York (state)
20th-century American male writers
20th-century American screenwriters